The women's individual trampoline competition at the 2014 Asian Games in Incheon, South Korea was held on 26 September 2014 at the Namdong Gymnasium.

Schedule
All times are Korea Standard Time (UTC+09:00)

Results

Qualification

Final

References

Results

External links
Official website

Trampoline Women